Wojciech Maciej Tkacz (born 14 May 1969) is a Polish former ice hockey player. He played for GKS Katowice, Mora IK, Unia Oświęcim, and GKS Tychy during his career. He also played for the Polish national team at the 1992 Winter Olympics, and multiple World Championships. In 1991 Tkacz led the Polish league in scoring.

References

External links
 

1969 births
Living people
GKS Katowice (ice hockey) players
GKS Tychy (ice hockey) players
Ice hockey players at the 1992 Winter Olympics
Mora IK players
Olympic ice hockey players of Poland
Polish ice hockey centres
Sportspeople from Katowice
TH Unia Oświęcim players